= Mithapur, Pakistan =

Coordinates: 32°05′N 71°03′E

Mithapur North-West Frontier Province, now in Pakistan is located at geographical coordinates: 32° 5' 0" North, 71° 3' 0" East.

The last ruler of Mithapur was Boota Shah whose rule came to an end after the independence of Pakistan in 1947. He was the eldest son of the Mitha Shah who was known as the "Sweet Emperor".
